Admiral Matthews or Mathews may refer to:

Andrew Mathews (Royal Navy officer) (born 1958), British Royal Navy vice admiral
H. Spencer Matthews (1921–2002), U.S. Navy rear admiral
Thomas Mathews (1676–1751), British Royal Navy admiral
Timothy S. Matthews (born 1958), U.S. Navy admiral